The University of Melbourne Australian Labor Party Club is a political student club at the University of Melbourne. It is the oldest student political club in Australia, founded in 1925- several months prior to the Sydney University Labor Club. Many members go on to be members of Parliament. It was founded to provide a means of organising students who support the Australian Labor Party. The club has been hugely influential on the University of Melbourne Student Union, and its members have held numerous positions within it. The club is strongly associated with the Labor Left of the Australian Labor Party.

History 
The ALP Club was originally established as the Labour Club in 1925 by Lloyd Ross, Brian Fitzpatrick and Ralph Gibson.  The Club grew to have 200 members, and in 1932 was the largest club on campus. In response to Communist influence on the club, in 1934 B. A. Santamaria formed a more moderate Labour-aligned club, the Radical Club. Throughout the 1930s, 40s and 50s the club was central to campus life, with members being prominent in clubs and societies, the running of the SRC and in the student magazine Farrago, as well as producing their own magazine Proletariat to distribute their ideas. In the 1950s, future Victorian Premier John Cain and future Opposition Leader Clyde Holding were involved in the organising of the club.

In the late 1980s and early 1990s, the ALP Club was closely involved in the Left Alliance, a group of left-wing students that opposed the union between the Labor Club (affiliated to the Labor Right) and Liberal Club.

In 2003, the Clubs & Societies Department of the Student Union, which had a Liberal Club and Labor Club majority, disaffiliated the ALP Club on a technicality. Despite lengthy attempts to overturn this decision, the student union was put into liquidation before the issue could be resolved.

The club has been affiliated to the Melbourne University Student Union (MUSU), and more recently the University of Melbourne Student Union (UMSU). After rebuilding throughout the early-mid 2000s, tickets for the Student Union election that had the involvement of the Club have won the majority of elections, usually under the banner of the Stand Up! ticket. Several members of the Club have also gone on to be President of the National Union of Students.

The culture of Victorian politics has been heavily moulded by the influence of the club, especially in the mid-20th century.

Politics 
In recent history the club has been decidedly left-leaning. This is in contrast to the University of Melbourne Labor Club, who are associated with the Labor Right. The existence of two Labor/ALP Clubs simultaneously is a result of a split in the Labor Club in 1949.

Currently, the club is aligned with the National Labor Students, the national Labor Left student faction. Prior to the formation of NLS in 2006, the club was part of Australian Labor Students (ALS), and had been part of the National Organisation of Labor Students (NOLS) prior to the split between NOLS and ALS in 1997.

In 1950, the stated goal of the club was: The A.L.P. Club, working from the basis of the A.L.P. platform, stands for the progressive reformation of society by democratic means, so as to achieve social justice for allThis goal continues to this day. The club has previously supported campaigns for free education and free healthcare, universal student unionism, feminism and democratic socialism among other concerns.

Past presidents

Notable alumni 

 Brian Fitzpatrick 
 Clyde Holding
 John Cain
 Andrew Giles
 Paul Erickson
Stephen Murray-Smith
 Manning Clark
 Ian Turner
 Jim Cairns
Blanche Merz

References 

Student politics in Australia
University of Melbourne
1925 establishments in Australia
Clubs and societies in Australia
Student organisations in Australia
Student organizations established in 1925
Student political organizations